Eugene Lang College of Liberal Arts, commonly referred to as Lang, is the seminar-style, undergraduate, liberal arts college of The New School.  It is located on-campus in Greenwich Village in New York City on West 11th Street off 6th Avenue.

History
Eugene Lang College of Liberal Arts was founded as the Freshman Year Program at The New School in 1972 as a pre-college program for high school graduates. Three years later, in 1975, the program was expanded to a full undergraduate program and renamed The Seminar College. In 1985, following a generous donation by Eugene Lang and his wife Theresa, the school was renamed Eugene Lang College. The college currently has an enrollment of over 1,345 students.

In 2005, the phrase "The New School" was inserted into the name of each division of The New School as part of a unification strategy initiated by the university's President Bob Kerrey; thus, Eugene Lang College was renamed Eugene Lang College The New School for Liberal Arts. In 2015, The New School rebranded again by renaming the schools to better clarify the relationship between the university and its schools. Eugene Lang College's formal title is The New School's Eugene Lang College of Liberal Arts.

Curriculum

Academics

The only required classes are an introductory course on New York City, taught from the perspective of the relation of philosophy to the physical; two lecture hall courses; and two semesters of Writing the Essay for first-year students. These intensive writing classes – part composition class and part linguistics – have titles such as "Going Underground," "What's Love Got to Do With It?," "Comedy as Critique," and "Cruel Shoes: A Trek Through the Absurd."  Students are encouraged to tailor the program to their own interests and academic goals.

Eugene Lang College hosts some of The New School's most experimental and avant-garde courses, including: "Heterodox Identities", "NYC: Graphic Gotham", "The Mind-Game Film" (taught by Silvia Vega-Llona), "The Illusion of Color", "Punk & Noise", "Masculinity in Asia," "Queer Culture", "Theories of Mind", and "Play and Toil in the Digital Sweatshop".

The college places emphasis on interdisciplinary learning with a "student-directed" curriculum. All of its courses are seminars. Students at Lang may also cross-register for courses sponsored by other divisions of The New School, especially Parsons School of Design and the School of Drama's new BFA program.  Students are allowed to double-major and apply for the university's honors program.

Student publications
Several of The New School's major publications are produced by Lang students.  Among these are: 
 The New School Free Press , a student-run newspaper published by the journalism concentration of the Writing department, has grown from a DIY zine-style pamphlet to a professionally printed broadsheet in the years since its founding in 2002, when it was known as Inprint. It is published monthly in print and it aims to serve both Lang and the wider New School community. The Free Press operates a blog  and makes digital copies of the newspaper available on the Lang website.
 12th Street, nationally distributed literary journal; contains works from undergraduate writers in The New School's Riggio Writing & Democracy Honors Program
 Eleven and a Half, the literary journal of Eugene Lang College
 The Weekly Observer, an online newsletter showcasing major student and alumni achievements, special program announcements, and other university-wide news.  Distributed via MyNewSchool web portal.

Notable alumni and faculty

Alumni

Ani DiFranco, musician
Elisa Donovan, actress
Karen Maine, director and screenwriter 
Matisyahu, musician
Sufjan Stevens, musician
Jake Shears, musician
Emily Gould, former co-editor of Gawker
Mike Doughty, musician
Jude Ellison Sady Doyle, feminist writer
Graeme K., musician
Stacey Farber, actress
Melissa Febos, writer
Travis Jeppesen, writer
Paul Dano, actor
Robert Schwartzman, musician and actor
Bethany Cosentino, musician of Best Coast
Borzou Daragahi, journalist
Nina Arianda, actress
Anita Glesta, artist

Faculty

Jennifer Baumgardner, feminist writer and speaker
Laurie Collyer, director/actress
Siddhartha Deb, novelist
Jill Eisenstadt, novelist, screenwriter, and journalist
Jennifer Gilmore, novelist
Mark Greif, co-editor of n+1
Shelley Jackson, novelist and short story writer
Margo Jefferson, former theatre critic at The New York Times
Hettie Jones, poet
Barrie Karp, artist
Greil Marcus, music critic
Dominic Pettman, writer and theorist
Kristin Prevallet, poet and writer
Katy Pyle, dancer and choreographer
Sara Ruddick, feminist philosopher
Lynda Schor, short story writer and literary editor
Christopher Sorrentino, novelist, short story writer
Mark Statman, writer, translator, poet
Sekou Sundiata, Grammy-nominated performance artist, poet
Elizabeth Swados, writer, composer, musician, and theatre director
McKenzie Wark, virtual media theorist
Caveh Zahedi, director/actor

Rankings
In some college ranking programs, The New School's eight divisions are ranked separately, since their attributes and standards of admission differ significantly.

The Princeton Review ranks Eugene Lang among "America's 371 Best Colleges" and the "Best Northeastern Colleges.".  Miriam Weinstein also cites the Eugene Lang division in her book, Making a Difference Colleges: Distinctive Colleges to Make a Better World.  Lang has also appeared on The Princeton Review's following national lists:
 "Dodgeball Targets" (#1)
 "Great College Towns" (#1)
 "Intercollegiate Sports Unpopular Or Nonexistent" (#1)
 "Class Discussions Encouraged" (#1)
 "Long Lines and Red Tape" (#1)
 "Students Most Nostalgic For Bill Clinton Politics" (#2)
 "Least Religious Students" (#2)
 "Nobody Plays Intramural Sports" (#2)
 "Birkenstock-Wearing, Tree-Hugging, Clove-Smoking Vegetarians" (#3)
 "Most Politically Active" (#7)
 "Town-Gown Relations Are Great" (#11)
 "Gay Community Accepted" (#13)
 "Most Liberal Students" (#16)
 "Students Dissatisfied with Financial Aid" (#18)
 "Lots of Race/Class Interaction" (#19)

See also
 Education in New York City
 The New York Intellectuals
 The New York Foundation
 Project Pericles
 National Book Award

References

The New School
Liberal arts colleges in New York City
Universities and colleges in New York City
Universities and colleges in Manhattan
Educational institutions established in 1985
1985 establishments in New York City
Private universities and colleges in New York City